Ismagulov is a Russian surname 'Исмагулов'. Its Kazakh version is Smaǵululy, 'Смағұлұлы'. Notable people with the surname include: 

Damir Ismagulov (born 1991), Russian mixed martial artist
Orazak Ismagulov (born 1930), Kazakh anthropologist

Russian-language surnames
Kazakh-language surnames